The Aircraft Accident Investigation Committee of Thailand (AAIC) is the aircraft accident and incident investigation committee of Thailand. It is subordinate to the Flight Standards Bureau, Department of Civil Aviation, Ministry of Transport.

See also

 Lauda Air Flight 004
 One-Two-GO Airlines Flight 269
 Thai Airways International Flight 261

References

External links
 "คําสงกระทรวงคมนาคม ั่ ที่ ๓๗๕/๒๕๕๐ เรองื่  การสอบสวนอุบัติเหตของอากาศยาน." (Archive) - "Ordinance of the Ministry of Transport. 375/2550. The investigation of aircraft accidents" - The ministerial regulation that formed the AAIC - Issued on 5 November 2007 (Thai year 2550)

Thailand
Aviation organizations based in Thailand
Sub-departmental government bodies of Thailand
Ministry of Transport (Thailand)